Busan Science High School(부산과학고등학교) is a public science special-purpose high school located in Busan, South Korea.

School Concepts

Establishment Background 
It was established in order to satisfy the wishes of parents in the Busan area and to form a base for training talented students in science and technology.

Establishment Purpose 
The purpose of this establishment is to select and educate students from the Busan area who have outstanding scientific talent. They aim to expand their intellectual curiosity and initiative, cultivate their moral character and personality, and develop leadership.

History 
 8 October 2002: Master plan for the school established
 25 November 2002: The ordinance of the school foundation issued.(Jang Young Sil Science High School)
 5 March 2003: The 1st entrance (80 freshmen)
 18 February 2005: The 1st early Graduation (43 11th graders)
 21 February 2006: The 1st Graduation and the 2nd Early Graduation(32 12th graders and 58 11th graders)
 6 January 2010: Name changed to 'Busan Science High School'
 19 August 2011: Busan Science High School has been relocated to the hew school in Guseo-dong Geumjeong-gu
 9 February 2012: The 7th Graduation and the 8th Early Graduation(17 12th graders and 70 11th graders)
 1 March 2016: Inauguration of the 7th principal, Woo Ui Ha
 27 February 2018: The 16th entrance (103 freshmen)

Curriculum

References 

Education in Busan
Educational institutions established in 2002
2002 establishments in South Korea